The Massacre of Trujillo was a series of murders perpetrated between 1988 and 1994 in the town of Trujillo, Valle del Cauca Department in southwestern Colombia by paramilitaries and the Cali Cartel with the complicity of active members of the Colombian military and police. 

Some 245 to 342 people, including unionists and suspected guerrilla supporters, were tortured and dismembered. Among the more gruesome murders was the decapitation and castration of Father Tiberio Fernandez, the local Jesuit priest. The murders were seen as a warning to other pro-guerrilla elements. Most of the corpses were thrown into the waters of the Cauca River.

Judicial Proceedings
The Colombian government declared itself guilty of negligence and the Inter-American Commission on Human Rights was also notified of the case. 

Some members of the Cali Cartel accused of participating in this massacre were Henry Loaiza-Ceballos "aka The Scorpion" and Juan Carlos Ortiz Escobar "aka Knife". 

The case was first officially acknowledged and investigated in the mid-1990s under Colombian President Ernesto Samper (1994–1998); however, no one was ever tried for the killings. Declassified U.S. government documents suggest that the United States government regarded this and other human rights investigations under President Samper as lacking resolve.

On March 19, 2008, the Attorney General of Colombia accused retired Colombian Army Major Alirio Antonio Urueña Jaramillo, former Colombian National Police Lieutenant José Fernando Berrio and former Sergeant Aníbal Álvarez Hoyos for their involvement with a paramilitary group during the massacre. 

In March 1990, Major Urueña was the acting commander of the Palacé Battalion in Buga which was engaging in counterinsurgency operations against the ELN guerrilla, Lieutenant Berrio Velásquez was acting commander of the police station in Trujillo and former Sergeant Álvarez Hoyos was in charge of the Sijin in Tuluá.

The case was re-opened in 2008 following the publication of an independent report by the Historical Memory Group.

References

Massacres in 1988
Massacres in 1989
Massacres in 1990
Conflicts in 1988
Conflicts in 1989
Conflicts in 1990
Massacres in Colombia
1980s in Colombia
1990s in Colombia
Colombian conflict